A murder-suicide is an act in which an individual kills one or more people either before or while killing themselves. The combination of murder and suicide can take various forms:

 Murder linked with suicide of a person with a homicidal ideation
 Murder which entails suicide, such as suicide bombing or the deliberate crash of a vehicle carrying the perpetrator and others
 Murder of an officer or bystander during the act of suicide by cop
 Suicide after murder to escape criminal punishment(s)
 Suicide after murder as a form of self-punishment due to guilt
 Suicide before or after murder by proxy
 Suicide after or during murder inflicted by others
 Murder to receive a death sentence willfully
 Joint suicide in the form of killing the other with consent, and then killing oneself

Suicide-lawful killing has three conceivable forms:
 To kill one's assailant through proportionate self-defense killing oneself in the process
 Lawful killing to prevent an individual from causing harm to others, in so doing killing oneself
 Lawful killing indirectly resulting in or contributing to suicide

Many spree killings have ended in suicide, such as in many school shootings. Some cases of religiously-motivated suicides may also involve murder. All categorization amounts to forming somewhat arbitrary distinctions where relating to intention in the case of psychosis, where the intention(s) is/are more likely than not to be irrational. Ascertaining the legal intention (mens rea) is inapplicable to cases properly categorized as insanity.

Some use the term murder–suicide to refer to homicide–suicide, which can include manslaughter and is therefore more encompassing.

Homicide and suicide theories 

According to the psychiatrist Karl A. Menninger, murder and suicide are interchangeable acts – suicide sometimes forestalling murder, and vice versa. Following Freudian logic, severe repression of natural instincts due to early childhood abuse may lead the death instinct to emerge in a twisted form. The cultural anthropologist Ernest Becker, whose theories on the human notion of death is strongly influenced by Freud, views the fear of death as a universal phenomenon, a fear repressed in the unconscious and of which people are largely unaware.

This fear can move individuals toward heroism, but also to scapegoating. Failed attempts to achieve heroism, according to this view, can lead to mental illness and/or antisocial behavior.

In a study specifically related to murder–suicide, Milton Rosenbaum (1990) discovered the murder–suicide perpetrators to be vastly different from perpetrators of homicide alone. Whereas murderer–suicides were found to be highly depressed and overwhelmingly men, other murderers were not generally depressed and more likely to include women in their ranks. In the U.S. the overwhelming number of cases are male-on-female. Around one-third of partner homicides end in the suicide of the perpetrator. From national and international data and interviews with family members of murder–suicide perpetrators, the following are the key predictors of murder–suicide: a history of substance abuse, the male partner some years older than the female partner, a break-up or pending break-up, a history of battering, and suicidal contemplation by the perpetrator.

Though there is no national tracking system for murder–suicides in the United States, medical studies into the phenomenon estimate between 1,000 and 1,500 deaths per year in the US, with the majority occurring between spouses or intimate partners and the vast majority of the perpetrators being male. Depression, marital or/and financial problems, and other problems are generally motivators.

Homicides which are later followed by suicide often make headline news; national statistics indicate 5% of all homicidal deaths are caused by murder–suicides. The U.S. Department of Health and Human Services, Centers for Disease Control reports that an estimated 1 million adults reported attempting suicide in 2011, and there were over 38,000 completed suicides in the same period. The estimate of 624 murder–suicide events per year indicates that around 1.6% of suicides involve murder.

In 18th-century Denmark, people wishing to commit suicide would sometimes commit murder in order to receive the death penalty. They believed murder followed by repentance would allow them to end their life while avoiding damnation.

See also 
Crime of passion
Mass murder
Mass shooting
School shooting
Serial killer
Spree killer
Shinjū
Suicide attack
Suicide by pilot
Kamikaze

References

Further reading 
 

 
Killings by type

de:Suizid#Erweiterter_Suizid